Marcus Bell may refer to:
Marcus Bell (lineman) (born 1979), former lineman in American football
Marcus Bell (linebacker) (born 1977), former linebacker in American football
Marcus Bell (musician), American music producer, composer, and musician
Detective Marcus Bell, a character in the television series Elementary